Owariki or Owa rigi (formerly Santa Catalina) is an island in Solomon Islands; it is located in Makira-Ulawa Province.

Description
This small coral island is 2.8 km long and 2 km wide. It is located off the eastern end of Makira (San Cristobal) Island, separated from it by a 7.5 km wide strait, and just south of slightly larger Owaraha (Santa Ana) Island. The sound between Owaraha and Owariki is only 2.5 km wide.

The inhabitants of Owariki speak the Owa language. They share the same culture with the people on Owaraha and on the eastern end of Makira.

History
First recorded sighting by Europeans was by the Spanish expedition of Álvaro de Mendaña on 4 July 1568. More precisely the sighting and also landing in Owariki was due to a local voyage done by a small boat, in the accounts the brigantine Santiago, commanded by Francisco Muñoz Rico and having Hernán Gallego as pilot. They charted it as Santa Catalina.

Owariki was visited, along with neighboring Owaraha, by the Austrian anthropologist and photographer Hugo Bernatzik in 1932. Bernatzik carefully documented daily life among the island people and published an ethnography a few years later.

References

External links 
 

Islands of the Solomon Islands